Riemerella columbipharyngis is a bacterium from the genus of Riemerella which has been isolated from the pharynx of a domestic pigeon.

References

Flavobacteria
Bacteria described in 2013